Washburn is an unincorporated community in Ritchie County, in the U.S. state of West Virginia.

History
A post office called Washburn was established in 1891, and remained in operation until 1963. The community was named after Cyrus Washburn, who was instrumental in securing the town a post office.

References

Unincorporated communities in Ritchie County, West Virginia
Unincorporated communities in West Virginia